Luke 16 is the sixteenth chapter of the Gospel of Luke in the New Testament of the Christian Bible. It records the teachings and parables of Jesus Christ, including the famous parable of the "rich man and Lazarus". The book containing this chapter is anonymous, but early Christian tradition uniformly affirmed that Luke the Evangelist composed this Gospel as well as the Acts of the Apostles.

Text
The original text was written in Koine Greek. This chapter is divided into 31 verses.

Textual witnesses
Some early manuscripts containing the text of this chapter are:
Papyrus 75 (AD 175-225)
Codex Vaticanus (325-350)
Codex Sinaiticus (330-360)
Codex Bezae (~400)
Codex Washingtonianus (~400)
Codex Alexandrinus (400-440)

Parable of the Unjust Steward 

This parable of Jesus appears in Luke, but not in the other canonical gospels of the New Testament. Verses 1 to 8a tell a story about a steward who is about to be dismissed, but "curries favor" with his master's debtors by remitting some of their debts. The New International Version calls this story "the parable of the shrewd manager", reflecting the wording of verse 8a where "the master commended the dishonest manager because he had acted shrewdly".

Verse 8b
For the people of this world are more shrewd in dealing with their own kind than are the people of the light.
This part-verse and the succeeding verses may be treated as part of the parable or as separate additions: commentators vary in their assessment of where the parable ends.

Verse 16
The law and the prophets [were] until John.
There is no verb in the original Greek: the word were is generally added to make sense of the sentence. The ISV says they were fulfilled with John. The NIV says they were proclaimed until John. Matthew's text says:
All the prophets and the law prophesied (επροφητευσαν, eprophēteusan) until John.

Account of the Rich Man and Lazarus 

The account of the rich man and Lazarus (also called the Dives and Lazarus or Lazarus and Dives) is a well-known teachings along with the parables of Jesus appearing in the Gospel of Luke. It tells of the relationship, in life and in death, between an unnamed rich man and a poor beggar named Lazarus. The traditional name, Dives, is not actually a name, but instead a word for "rich man", dives, in the text of the Latin Bible, the Vulgate. The rich man was also given the names Neuēs (i.e. Nineveh) and Fineas (i.e. Phineas) in the 3rd and 4th centuries.

Along with the parables of the Ten Virgins, Prodigal Son, and Good Samaritan, it was one of the most frequently illustrated teachings in medieval art, perhaps because of its vivid account of an afterlife.

The name Lazarus, from the Hebrew: אלעזר, Elʿāzār, Eleazar - "God is my help", also belongs to the more famous biblical character Lazarus of Bethany, known as "Lazarus of the Four Days", who is the subject of a prominent miracle attributed to Jesus in the Gospel of John, in which Jesus resurrects him four days after his death.

See also 
 Abraham
 Lazarus
 Ministry of Jesus
 Moses
 Parables of Jesus
 Other related Bible parts: Deuteronomy 1, Mark 10, Luke 4, Luke 24, Romans 7

References

External links 
 King James Bible - Wikisource
English Translation with Parallel Latin Vulgate
Online Bible at GospelHall.org (ESV, KJV, Darby, American Standard Version, Bible in Basic English)
Multiple bible versions at Bible Gateway (NKJV, NIV, NRSV etc.)

Gospel of Luke chapters